Masada: Vav, also known as ו or Masada 6, is a 1995 album by American jazz composer and saxophonist John Zorn released on the Japanese DIW label.   It is the sixth album in the Masada project.

Reception
The Allmusic review by Mark Kirschenmann awarded the album 4½ stars stating "John Zorn's writing is particularly focused and well-informed, full of serpentine lines, mixed meters, and sudden shifts in tempo, while leaving plenty of room for collective and individual improvisation. The ensemble and the individual playing are uniformly superb throughout".

Track listing
All compositions by John Zorn
"Debir" – 8:02
"Shebuah" – 8:09
"Mikreh" – 3:57
"Tiferet" – 4:05
"Nevalah" – 2:10
"Miktav" – 9:40
"Nashon" – 8:37
"Avelut" – 7:31
"Beer Sheba" – 8:50
Recorded at Power Station in New York City on July 16 and 17, 1995

Personnel
John Zorn — alto saxophone
Dave Douglas — trumpet
Greg Cohen — bass
Joey Baron — drums

References

1995 albums
Masada (band) albums
DIW Records albums